Hemidactylus masirahensis is a species of house gecko. It is endemic to Masirah Island, off the coast of central Oman.

References

Further reading
 Vasconcelos, Raquel, and Salvador Carranza. "Systematics and biogeography of Hemidactylus homoeolepis Blanford, 1881 (Squamata: Gekkonidae), with the description of a new species from Arabia." Zootaxa 3835.4 (2014): 501–527.

Hemidactylus
Reptiles of the Middle East
Reptiles described in 2012
Endemic fauna of Oman